Nadia Lichtig (born 1973) is an artist currently living in the South of France. In her multilayered work, voice is transposed into various media including painting, print, sculpture, photography, performance, soundscape and song.
A monograph on Lichtig's work, Pictures of Nothing, was published by Kerber Verlag in 2014.

Early life and education 
Lichtig was born in 1973 in Munich, Germany; her parents were of Czech and Serb descent. Lichtig studied at the University of the Arts Paris. Having grown up between several countries and languages, Nadia Lichtig studied linguistics at the Ludwig Maximilian University of Munich in Germany, and sculpture at the Ecole des Beaux-Arts de Paris, France with Jean-Luc Vilmouth, where she graduated with honours in 2001, before assisting Mike Kelley in Los Angeles the same year.

Work
In her works, each medium approached not as a field to be mastered, but as a source of possibilities to question our ability to decipher the present. Visual and aural aspects entangle in her performances. Lichtig taught at the Srishti Institute of Art, Design and Technology, Bangalore, India as a visiting professor in 2006, at the Ecole des Beaux-Arts of the Valence in 2007, and since 2009, is professor of Fine Arts at the Ecole Supérieure des Beaux-arts of Montpellier, France. She has collaborated with musicians who are also visual artists, such as Bertrand Georges (audible), Christian Bouviou (Popopfalse), Nicole (La Chatte), Nina Canal (Ut) and Michael Moorley (the dead C). Lichtig worked and works under several group names and pseudonyms including: EchoparK, Falseparklocation, Skrietch, Ghosttrap and Nanana.

Lichtig's collaborative work in Drift: Art and Dark Matter, was reviewed in the publication, Symmetry magazine.

Publications 

 Post-Specimen, Intellect Books, Bristol, Great Britain, ed. by Ed Juler and Alistair Robinson, 2021

 Grammaires fantômes / Phantomgrammatiken, ed. by Maison de Heidelberg / Goetheinstitut, France, 2020

 Bunkern, Privater Bunkerbau an Zellen, im Kalter Krieg und in Prepper-Fanatsien by Mona Schieren in "Re-Bunkern" ed. by Kathrin von Malzahn and Mona Schieren in collaboration with Franciska Zolyorn, Argobooks, Berlin, Germany, 2019

 Phototropia, 2019, ed. by Maison de Heidelberg / Goetheinstitut, France, 2019

 Monograph: Pictures of Nothing, Kerber Verlag, Bielefeld, Germany, 2018

Collections 

 Centre Pompidou, Paris, France
 Hanse-Wissenschaftskolleg, Delmenhorst, Germany
 Musée d'art Contemporain, Sérignan, France
 URDLA, Lyon, France
 Terra Art Foundation, Paris/Chicago
 Collection of the Ecole Superieure des Beaux-Arts de Paris
 Fuhlbrügge & Müller collection, Germany
 Abay Maskara collection, India
 Merkel Collection, Germany

Exhibitions 
 2022: Drift: Art and Dark Matter, Carleton University Art Gallery, Ottawa, Canada
 2021: Drift: Art and Dark Matter, Agnes Etherington Art Centre, Kingston, Canada
 2021: Drift: Art and Dark Matter, Morris and Helen Belkin Art Gallery, Vancouver, Canada
 2021: Muj Utek, Zamek, Posnan, Poland
 2019: Blank Spots, Schwankhalle, Bremen, Germany
 2019: Memory Gardens, Hanse-Wissenschafts-Kolleg, Delmenhorst, Germany
 2018: Catching the Light, cur. by Ludwig Seyfarth, Kai 10 / Arthena Foundation, Düsseldorf, Germany
 2018: Nachtstücke (three person solo), cur. by Dr. Heidi Brunnschweiler, Galerie für Gegenwartskunst, Freiburg, Germany
 2017: Ghosttrap, cur. by Susanne Prinz, Kunstverein am Rosa-Luxemburg-Platz, Berlin, Germany

Awards and public space projects 

 2021: Residency Goethe Institut Bucharest, Romania
 2020: Residency, Center of Astrophysics, Queen's University, Canada
 2020: Residency, Goethe Institut, Marseille, France
 2018-19: Residency / Fellow of the Hanse-WIssenschafts-Kolleg / Institute for Advanced Research, Germany
 2013: Institut Francais, London, French Embassy, UK
 2012: Collection Musée d'art contemporain de Sérignan 2011, 1% artistique, Public Art Project, Sérignian, France
 2009: Dicream, CNC Ile-de-France, France
 2008: Biennale de Rennes, public art project, Résidence Synagogue de Delme, France
 2001: Terra Art Foundation, Fellowship residency

References

Further reading 
 Lichtig, N., Dufour, M., Seyfarth, L., & Lebron, M. (2014). Nadia Lichtig: pictures of nothing. Kerber Verlag.
 Maltzahn, Katrin von, Mona Schieren, and Franciska Zólyom. Re:BUNKER Erinnerungskulturen, Analogien, Technoide Mentalitäten. Berlin: Argobooks, 2019.
 Juler, E., Robinson, A., & Lichtig, N. (2020). ch. 8, Nadia Lichtig: Poetry and the Pathology of the Museum: A model of difference. In Post-specimen encounters between art, science and curating rethinking art practice and objecthood through scientific collections. essay, Intellect Books.

French women artists
Living people
1973 births